The Edge of Sleep is a thiller podcast produced by QCode and starring Markiplier.

Background 
The show is produced by QCode and stars Markiplier. The first season debuted on September 24, 2019, and ended on November 5, 2019. The first season consisted of eight episodes that averaged 25 minutes each. The show follows a night watchman named Dave Torres who attempts to survive a global crisis where anyone who goes to sleep dies. The show has a similar premise to Invasion of the Body Snatchers. 

In April 2021, QCode partnered with New Regency to adapt The Edge of Sleep into a television series. The show was filmed in Vancouver in the summer of 2021.

In April 2022, a second season of the podcast was announced, with an expected release in 2023.

References 

Audio podcasts
2019 podcast debuts
Thriller podcasts
Scripted podcasts
American podcasts